Dovilai is a small town in Klaipėda County, in northwestern Lithuania. According to the 2011 census, the town has a population of 1,246 people.

Dovilai town has a middle school, kindergarten, culture house, library, church, post office and a Rural tourism homestead. 
In 1736 a first primary school in Dovilai was opened, which became an eight-year school in 1971 and a middle school in 1986. In 2009 coat of arms of the town was approved.

References

Towns in Lithuania
Towns in Klaipėda County